Keystone Heights Junior/Senior High School (KHHS) is a public high school serving students in the seventh through twelfth grades in Keystone Heights, Clay County, Florida, USA and is part of the Clay County School District.

Extracurriculars

Clubs and organizations
KHHS supports the following clubs:

Band
B.E.A.T. Club
Drama Club
French Honor Society/Club
Future Farmers of America (FFA)
Interact
Health Occupations Students of America (HOSA)
Math Honor Society
National Honor Society (NHS)
Pageant Committee
I Am Second
National Speech and Debate Association
Students for Christ
Strengthening Our Students (Project SOS)
Student Literacy Council
Technology Student Association (TSA)
Thespian Troupe

Robotics Club
Video Game Club

Sports
KHHS competes in Class 2A District 3 of the Florida High School Athletic Association (FHSAA). and fields teams Varsity and Junior Varsity teams in several sports:

Baseball
Boys Basketball
Girls Basketball
Cheerleading
Boys Cross Country
Girls Cross Country
Football
Girls Flag Football
Boys Golf
Girls Golf
Boys Soccer
Girls Soccer
Softball Fastpitch
Boys Tennis
Girls Tennis
Boys Track
Girls Track
Volleyball
Boys Weightlifting
Girls Weightlifting

Performance
KHHS is accredited by the Southern Association of Colleges and Schools. For the 2006–2007 school year, it exceeded the state average in all reported categories.

References

External links
Keystone Heights Junior/Senior High School
Clay County School District
greatschools - Keystone Heights Junior/Senior High School
KHHS Alumni website 1963-2013

High schools in Clay County, Florida
Public high schools in Florida
Public middle schools in Florida
Educational institutions established in 1965
1965 establishments in Florida